The 2015 Kansas State Wildcats football team represented Kansas State University in the 2015 NCAA Division I FBS football season. The Wildcats played their home games at Bill Snyder Family Football Stadium, in Manhattan, Kansas as they have done since 1968. The Wildcats were led by head coach Bill Snyder in his 24th overall and seventh straight season since taking over for his second tenure in 2009. 2015 was the 120th season in school history. K-State was a member of the Big 12 Conference. They finished the season 6–7, 3–6 in Big 12 play to finish in eighth place. They were invited to the Liberty Bowl where they lost to Arkansas.

Previous season
The 2014 Kansas State Wildcats football team finished the regular season 9-3, with losses to Auburn of the SEC, Baylor and TCU. The Wildcats had been ranked in all polls with the highest ranked in the new College Football Playoff rankings at number 7. Kansas State became bowl eligible after winning its sixth game against Texas on October 25 and was invited to play in the 2015 Alamo Bowl against UCLA. Kansas State fell short to the Bruins in San Antonio, Texas with a loss of 35–40.

Schedule
Kansas State announced their 2015 football schedule on November 19, 2014. The 2015 schedule consists of seven home games and five away games in the regular season. The Wildcats will host Big 12 foes Baylor, Iowa State, Oklahoma, TCU, and West Virginia and will travel to Kansas, Oklahoma State, Texas, and Texas Tech.

The Wildcats hosted two non conference games against South Dakota and Louisiana Tech and traveled to its other non conference foe UTSA in San Antonio, TX.

On December 6, 2015, Kansas State accepted an invitation to play in the 2016 AutoZone Liberty Bowl on January 2 in Memphis, Tennessee.

Game summaries

at UTSA

Louisiana Tech

at Oklahoma State

Kansas State traveled to Stillwater, Oklahoma to take on the 25th-ranked Cowboys on October 3, 2015.  Late in the second quarter, an officiating error gave Oklahoma State a first down when the offense was four yards short of the line to gain after the third down play.  The series ended with a touchdown for Oklahoma State.

The error brought into question Big 12 Conference officiating, especially in light that the game was on the 25th anniversary of the Fifth Down Game between the Colorado Buffaloes and Missouri Tigers.  SB Nation published "K-State lost to Oklahoma State, 36-34. Inept Big 12 officials gifted Oklahoma State a touchdown."  The Big 12 Conference later acknowledged the error and that disciplinary actions will be addressed with both the field officials and chain crew.

Oklahoma State won the game on a last-minute field goal.

TCU

As the winner of the 2015 TCU–Kansas State football game, TCU took the lead in the all-time series against the Wildcats, with an overall record of 5–4. The Horned Frogs' come-from-behind win marked Gary Patterson's first win as a head coach against his alma mater in Manhattan.  Jaden Oberkrom tied the all-time TCU career field goal record with a 50-yd field goal in the first half.  The win marked the Frogs' 14th in a row, tying the all-time TCU record for consecutive wins. TCU's 52 points notched a school-record 5-game-50+ point streak.  With the win, the Horned Frogs are now 25–1 when ranked in the top 5 and 36–3 when ranked in the top 10 under coach Patterson.

Oklahoma

Baylor

at Texas Tech

With the win, the Red Raiders broke a two-game losing streak against the Wildcats and became bowl eligible for the first time since the 2013 season. In the third quarter, kicker Clayton Hatfield made a season long 48 yard field goal.

Iowa State

at Kansas

West Virginia

vs. Arkansas

After finishing their season 6–6, the Wildcats accepted their invitation to play in the game.

This was the Wildcats' first Liberty Bowl.  They would later play Navy in the 2019 Liberty Bowl were they would again suffer defeat.

Source: 

Arkansas running back Alex Collins was named the game's MVP, after gaining 185 yards and 3 touchdowns on 23 carries.

References

Kansas State
Kansas State Wildcats football seasons
Kansas State Wildcats football